Onia may refer to:
 Plural of onium, a bound state of a particle and its antiparticle
 Onia, Arkansas, an unincorporated community in Stone County, Arkansas
 Onia (clothing), a New York City based clothing company

See also
 Onias (disambiguation)